Duncan R. Lorimer (born 1969) is a British-born American astrophysicist. He is a professor of astronomy at West Virginia University, known for the discovery of the first fast radio burst in 2007.

Discovery of fast radio burst
The first fast radio burst was discovered in 2007 when Lorimer assigned his student David Narkevic at West Virginia University to look through archival data taken in 2001 by the Parkes radio dish in Australia. Analysis of the survey data found a 30-jansky dispersed burst which occurred on July 24, 2001, less than 5 milliseconds in duration, located 3° from the Small Magellanic Cloud. The burst became known as the Lorimer Burst or FRB 010724.

Family
Lorimer's wife Maura McLaughlin is also a professor at West Virginia University. They have three children.

References 

American astrophysicists
1969 births
Living people
Alumni of the University of Wales
Alumni of the University of Manchester
West Virginia University faculty
Fellows of the American Physical Society